The Ukrainian Federation of Strength Athletes (UFSA) is a federation of strength athletes in Ukraine. It was created in 2001 and is a member of the International Federation of Strength Athletes (IFSA) which includes 54 national federations.

References

External links
 Professional League Strongmens of Ukraine 

Sports governing bodies in Ukraine
Strength athletics organizations
Tug of war
Sports organizations established in 2001
2001 establishments in Ukraine